Dr Jill Daniels is a British independent filmmaker and a Senior Lecturer in Film at University of East London.

Early life
Daniels was born in Manchester, Lancashire, England and comes from a Jewish family of Romanian and Russian extraction . She studied fine art at Wimbledon School of Art . She received an M.A. in Film and Television from the Royal College of Art, London and gained her PhD at the University of East London . She was a founding member and the London Secretary of the Independent Filmmakers Association .

Career
Daniels joined the Working Women’s Charter Campaign and edited the newspaper Women’s Fight, from 1977 to 1981 . In 1991 she was a jury member of the Huesca International Film Festival, Spain .  She wrote a chapter for the book Truth, Dare or Promise: Art and Documentary Revisited (2013), Cambridge Scholars, Newcastle Upon Tyne . In 2019 she published the book Memory, Place and Autobiography, Cambridge Scholars, Newcastle Upon Tyne. She is a member of the editorial board of the Journal, Media Practice and Education .

References

External links

 Staff webpage at UEL

Living people
Year of birth missing (living people)
English film directors
English people of Romanian-Jewish descent
English people of Russian-Jewish descent
Mass media people from Manchester
Alumni of Wimbledon College of Arts
Alumni of the University of the Arts London
Alumni of the Royal College of Art
Alumni of the University of East London